Tiina Benno (born 19 April 1961 Tartu) is an Estonian politician. She was a member of VII Riigikogu.

References

Living people
1961 births
Members of the Riigikogu, 1992–1995
Women members of the Riigikogu
Politicians from Tartu